Chapultepec is a station on the Mexico City Metro. It is located in the Cuauhtémoc borough in the center of Mexico City. In 2019, the station had an average ridership of 57,873 passengers per day, making it the 14th busiest station in the network.

General information

The station logo depicts a grasshopper (chapulín). The station's name comes from the Bosque de Chapultepec, a large nearby park that contains a hill with the same name. Chapultepec means "grasshopper hill" in Nahuatl.  The station was opened on 5 September 1969 with service eastward to Sevilla, when Chapultepec served as the western terminus of Line 1. Westward service from Chapultepec to Juanacatlán started 11 April 1970.

Chapultepec lies along Line 1 only.  Despite no longer being a terminal and not being a transfer station for other metro lines, the station does play an important role as a bus transfer station, connecting with a vast array of microbuses that service the north of Mexico City and areas in the adjacent State of México, such as Ciudad Satélite, Valle Dorado, Arboledas and Cuautitlán Izcalli.

The station is also served by two trolleybus lines of STE:  One is L2 (formerly route S), which runs east from Chapultepec to Metro Velódromo along the arterial thoroughfares known as Eje 2 Sur and Eje 2A Sur and is one of two high-frequency trolleybus lines that STE calls "Zero-Emissions Corridors". The other is route I, which connects Chapultepec with Metro El Rosario, to the north.

Chapultepec has an information desk; the station forecourt also contains a collection of retail stores, including a clothes boutique, a drugstore and a record store.

The station serves the following neighborhoods: San Miguel Chapultepec, Colonia Juárez, Colonia Condesa and Colonia Roma Norte.

Nearby
Headquarters of the Secretariat of Health
Headquarters of the Mexican Social Security Institute
Torre Mayor, 225 metres tall skyscraper.
Bosque de Chapultepec, the closest points of interest to the station are:
Museo de Arte Moderno, museum of modern art.
Chapultepec Castle
Heroic Cadets Memorial, monument dedicated to the memory of the Niños Héroes.
Chapultepec Zoo
Estela de Luz, monument that commemorates the bicentenary of Mexico's independence.

Exits
East: Tampico street and Avenida Chapultepec, Colonia Roma Norte
Northeast: Circuito Interior José Vasconcelos, Colonia Juárez
West: Circuito Interior, San Miguel Chapultepec
Northwest: Circuito Interior, Colonia Juárez
North: Circuito Interior and Bosque de Chapultepec
South: Circuito Interior José Vasconcelos, Colonia Condesa

Ridership

Gallery

References

External links 
 

Chapultepec
Railway stations opened in 1969
1969 establishments in Mexico
Mexico City Metro stations in Cuauhtémoc, Mexico City